Polygala irregularis is a species of flowering plant in the family Polygalaceae. It produces lilac to reddish-brown flowers. It is native to grasslands and sandy areas of Northern Africa, the Middle East, and South Asia with altitudes below .

References

irregularis
Taxa named by Pierre Edmond Boissier